Korean Taiwanese may refer to:
Koreans in Taiwan
Taiwanese people in South Korea
Taiwanese people in North Korea
South Korea–Taiwan relations
North Korea–Taiwan relations
Multiracial people of Korean and Taiwanese descent